Johan Sara Jr. born 1963 is a Sami musician (guitar and yoik) and a central Sami composer, producer, teacher, arranger, actor and performer of contemporary music with roots in the Sami tradition.

Career 

Sara Jr. was born and raised in Alta, and studied classical guitar at the Music Conservatory in Tromsø, as well as music pedagogics. He taught music at the Sami University College in Kautokeino. Sara jr. is the leader of Johan Sara Jr. Group, who released  (1995).
With a new line up (Geir Lysne wind instruments, Knut Aalefjær drums, Erik Halvorsen keyboards) came the release Boska (2003), with a musical expression described as punk-joik-jazz. The next album is called Orvoš (2009) with the J. S. Jr. Group.

The orchestra has an extensive list of international touring. In 2010 he toured Japan, where he played for sold-out houses in Osaka and Tokyo, where he would be hold a total of four concerts. In the summer of 2011 he played the Roskilde Festival, where he received massive applause from a lofty festival audiences for his jazzy yoik with a band consisting of among others Terje Johannessen. The same year he was awarded the Edvard Prize 2011, from TONO, for the album Transmission – Rievdadus in open class under Ultima Oslo Contemporary Music Festival. The Jury Rationale states  "soundscape of natural sounds, voices, breathing and occasional heavy rhythms fuse into exciting music. It is unpredictable, Johan Sara Jr invites us on a journey, and we want to follow. From the minimalist to the great epic, all rooted in something we can all recognize ourselves in – namely, our roots."

Sara Jr. has also written music for radio and theater, most recently for the Hålogaland Teater (Idag og i morgen, 2005).

Awards and honors 
In 2001, Sara received the Áillohaš Music Award, a Sámi music award conferred by the municipality of Kautokeino and the Kautokeino Sámi Association to honor the significant contributions the recipient or recipients has made to the diverse world of Sámi music.

In 2010, he won the Edvard-prisen in the open class category for his album Transmission – Rievdadus.

Discography

As band leader 
As Johan Sara Jr. & Group
1995:  (DAT)
2003: Boska (DAT)
2009: Orvos (DAT)

Other projects 
1999: Calbmeliiba (Frozen Moments) (DAT), with Erik Steen, Inga Juuso, Jai Shankar Sahajpal, Rogelio De Badajoz Duran 
2008: Mino Mano (Stierdna), in Turkey
2009: Ludiin Muitalan (Telling with Yoik) (DAT), with Ole Larsen Gaino
2010: Transmission – Rievdad (DAT)

References

External links 

Artist of the Year: Johan Sara Jr - on SapmiMusic.com
Tradition vs. innovation – Johan Sara jr. renews Sami chanting tradition – Ballade.no from the Norwegian Music Information

Norwegian Sámi musicians
Áillohaš Music Award winners
Norwegian musicians
Norwegian Sámi people
People from Kautokeino
1965 births
Living people